Ibrahim Abukari (born 31 August 1996) is a Ghanaian footballer who currently plays as a centre-back for Ghana Premier League side WAFA, whom he also captains.

Career 
Abukari started his career with West African Football Academy in 2015. He was immediately added to the first team squad ahead of the 2016 season. He made his debut during the first match of the season against Asante Kotoko on 20 February 2016, which ended in a 2–0 victory for WAFA. He scored his debut goal on 14 September 2016, scoring the lone goal in a match against Berekum Chelsea. He made 25 league appearances and scored a goal in his debut season. During their record high 2nd-place finish during the 2017 season, he played 28 league matches and scored 3 goals, only missing two matches. Due to an injury he did not feature any match in the 2018 season, even though the league was cancelled due to the GFA dissolution which came about due to the Anas Number 12 Expose.

He made an injury return during the 2019 GFA Normalization Special Competition, which he played 13 league matches and scored a goal. Ahead of the 2019–20 season, he was named as the captain of the side after serving as captain also during the 2019 GFA competition. The season was however suspended in March 2020 and later cancelled due to the COVID-19 pandemic in Ghana. He made 15 league appearances and scored 3 goals before it was cancelled.

References

External links 

 
 

1996 births
Living people
Ghanaian footballers
Ghana Premier League players
West African Football Academy players
Association football defenders